Devara Gudi is a 1975 Indian Kannada-language drama film starring Vishnuvardhan and Bharathi along with Leelavathi, Manjula and Rajesh. The film was directed and edited by R. Ramamurthy and written by A. S. Prakasham

The film was a remake of Tamil film  Puguntha Veedu (1972) which was earlier remade in Telugu as Puttinillu Mettinillu (1973) and later in Hindi as Teri Kasam (1982).

Cast
 Vishnuvardhan as Sundar
 Bharathi Vishnuvardhan as Suchitra
 Manjula as Vasanthi
 Leelavathi as Sundar and Vasanthi's mother
 Manorama
 Rajesh as Bhaskar
 K. S. Ashwath as Bhaskar and Suchitra's father
 Shivaram as Kitty
 B. Jaya

Soundtrack

All the songs are composed and scored by Rajan–Nagendra and written by Chi. Udaya Shankar. The album has five soundtracks. The songs are considered to be evergreen hits and are played frequently across all Kannada FM channels.

References

External links

Devara Gudi songs at Raaga

1975 films
1970s Kannada-language films
Films scored by Rajan–Nagendra
Kannada remakes of Tamil films
1975 action films
Films directed by R. Ramamurthy